The Palani Hills Wildlife Sanctuary and National Park is a proposed protected area in Dindigul District, Tamil Nadu India. The park will be an upgrade and expansion of the 736.87 km2 (PRO) Palani (Kodaikanal) Wildlife Sanctuary which was to be established in 2008.

History

The Palani Hills derive their name from the ancient temple town of Palani (பழநி in Tamil) located at the northern base of the hills.

In 1906, the great undulating plateau on top of the Palanis comprising four forest ranges were consolidated under the Indian Forest Act of 1878 and designated by the British Government as a single reserve forest, from Kodaikanal town to the Kerala state border in the west and the Bodinayakkanur town limits to the south, and given the name of the Ampthill Downs.

The Ampthill Downs area is now named Upper Palani Shola Reserved Forest and totals  (36,000 acres) of forest land. It is the largest reserve forest division in the Palani Hills. The core of the proposed Kodaikanal Wildlife Sanctuary awaiting government notification is located in this division.

In 1988, the new  Kodaikanal-Berijam Wildlife Sanctuary was included in the protected area proposals considered to be of national priority status by the Wildlife Institute of India.
In the early 1990s, the Tamil Nadu Forest Department submitted a proposal to the State government to protect much of the Palani Hills by declaring the area a wildlife sanctuary or a national park.

The proposed park area includes only reserve forest land. These forests are already among the protected areas of Tamil Nadu. Their upgrade to Wildlife Sanctuary and National Park will increase their IUCN status from level VI - Protected Area with Sustainable Use of Natural Resources to IV - Habitat/Species Management Area or II - National Park and improve the habitat and wildlife conservation of the area.

The sanctuary has been under consideration of the Government of India in consultation with the Government of Tamil Nadu since 1999. The actual park boundaries have not been finalized. In 2007, proposals for declaration of Kodaikanal Wildlife Sanctuary were under consideration of the Government.

On 13 August 2012, in an apparent change away from plans for notification of parts of the Palani Hills as a separate wildlife sanctuary, the Tamil Nadu Gazette notification attached parts of Kodaikanal and Dindigul divisions of reserve forests to the buffer zone of Annamalai Tiger Reserve.  About 5155.42 hectares of forest land belonging to Palani Hills Northern Slope, Andipatty reserve forest, 4,344.53 acres in Kudraiyar block forest and 5,548.49 hectares in Mannavanur Range in Kodaikanal will be included in the buffer zone. The villages and hamlets that now form part of the Palani Hills buffer zone are Poondi, Mannavanur, Kilavarai, Polur, Kavunchi, Kumbur, Kilanavayal, Kukkal, Pazhamputhur and Puthurpuram.

The increasingly important economic role of Eco-tourism, including: trekking, hiking, camping, mountaineering, rock climbing and bird watching may help the local populace to welcome this new Protected area. It remains to be seen whether the Wildlife Sanctuary and National Park will stimulate or stifle commercial development and tourism. The decision to finally establish the park must balance short term financial benefits of the status quo versus long term stability of the natural and human community.

Geography

The western extremity of the park is contiguous with the Manjampatti Valley core area of the Indira Gandhi Wildlife Sanctuary and National Park and with The Chinnar Wildlife Sanctuary in Kerala. The Kurinjimala Sanctuary in Kerala borders the southwestern corner of the park. These Wildlife Sanctuaries are adjacent to the recently established Eravikulam National Park.

The park area includes only reserve forest land, including Palni Hills Northern Slope East, Kallar, Palni Hills Southern Slope East, Upper Palni Shola, Allinagaram, and Palni Hills Northern Slope West Reserve Forests in the Dindigul 
and Kodaikanal Forest Divisions.

Geology

History
The Palani Hills are formed of pre-Cambrian gneisses, charnockites and schists; they are among the oldest mountain ranges in India. The park is an eastward extension of the Western Ghats hills formed by separation of the India-Madagascar-Seychelles blocks of East Gondwana in the Early Cretaceous period about 120 million years ago.

It is surrounded to the north, east and south by the Deccan Plateau formed later in the massive Deccan Traps eruption 66 million years ago as India drifted over the Reunion Hotspot.

Mountains
The ten most prominent peaks are: 
Vandaravu  , 
Ibex Peak   
Vembadi Peak , 
Gundar ,
Karunmakadu  ,
Sandana Parai 
Venkombu 
Tina Vardi ,
Perumal Malai , 
Vellari Malai  
The hill station of Kodaikanal stands in a 2,195 m (7,202 ft) high basin at the southern edge of the central part. The eastern end of the park is made of hills 1000–1500 m (3,281 ft - 4,921 ft) high.

The Tamil Nadu Department of Geology and Mining has completed detailed Geo-Technical Studies of the Palni Hills determining moderate to high landslide danger in much of the area.

Waterfalls

There are many waterfalls throughout the park which are popular tourist attractions.

 Bamen Falls
 Glen Falls  at Vilpatti on Palar (Kallar) River
 Neptune Falls and Pool at,  are down a pine needle path through large pines beginning on left of road  past Forest Dept. Nursery,   from Kodaikanal on Poombrai Road.
 Palar Upper Falls also called  Anju Veedu Falls (Five House Falls),  photo, photo, on Palar stream 5.5 km southeast of Palar Reservoir and 1.7 km downstream north from Ganesha Puram village, per 1974 survey map.  from Kodaikanal), in the Vilpatti Range. Spectacular waterfalls with dangerous currents. This stream originates in the Kodaikanal lake.
 Palar Lower falls  photo, photo, on Palar stream 5.5 km southeast of Palar Reservoir and 1.7 km downstream north from Ganesha Puram village, per 1974 survey map.  from Kodaikanal), in the Vilpatti Range. Spectacular waterfalls with dangerous currents. This stream originates in the Kodaikanal lake.
 Poombarai Falls
 Pambar Falls (also called Liril or Vatakanal) at, elevation , is  SE from Kodaikanal.
 Skamba Falls at is  NE from Kodaikanal).
 Snake Falls   Just below Pambar Falls where Levigne stream comes out of Pambar Shola.  Is particularly visible from Priests Walk and from top end of Coolie Ghat just below Shenbuganour.
It is the highest waterfall in Tamil Nadu and the third highest in India.
 Kathirikkai Falls is at, elevation .
 Unnamed Falls at is on Dolphins Nose Trail.
 Poondi Falls at estimated from Army Map and contours
 Kumbakarai Falls located in the lower Palni foothills, along the Kodai-Vellagavi-Periyakulam footpath. These falls have two stages. At the first stage water collects in huge rock recesses which are each named after wild animals such as tiger, elephant and snake. The Pambar river then flows  to the second stage before falling as the main waterfall. Bathing is allowed. There is a bus from Periyakulam with fare of Rs. 5(6.00,7.00 13.00,15.30,16.30 hrs).
 Unnamed Falls 10m, in Allinagaram Reserved Forest, elevation , location estimated from Map
 Unnamed Falls 15m  height , elevation , location estimated from Map

Climate

The Palani Hills have a montane tropical monsoon climate which varies from west to east. Generally, as one proceeds from the Kerala border in the west to the foothills in the east, average rainfall decreases and temperature increases. Compared to the Deccan plateau and the southwestern coastal plains, temperatures vary from moderate to quite cool. In January, night temperatures sometimes drop below freezing, and thin ice is seen on lake edges in the early morning.

The climate of the upper Palnis has four clearly defined seasons: 
the dry season, usually between January and March, during which rain is scarce and limited to around 10 rainy days, the air is crisp, dry and cold, and when ground frost occurs;
The warm season of April and May when most tourists arrive for their holiday in the hills and when summer showers and rain may fall on 18 to 20 days;
The Southwest monsoon season extends between June and September, with around 45 days of rainfall spread over the four months;
The Northeast monsoon season from October through early December, when rain is abundant and occurs over 30 or more days. Depending on the timing of the northeast monsoon, the latter half of December may experience a few days of heavy rain or remain completely dry. 

Tribes

Nomadic Paliyan tribes people have been seen living in some of the several caves in Manjampatti Valley. Paliyan people can be seen near Kukal Cave. The Tamil speaking Pulayan are referred to as the MalaPulayans, a group categorized as scheduled caste by State government of Tamil Nadu. Their traditional livelihood is foraging yams and small gaming in the nearby forest areas combined with cultivation of several species of minor millets in small plots located near their hamlets to meet their subsistence requirements.

They live in small hamlets in huts and government constructed colonies. The sedentary life started with the construction of group houses by the government in the early sixties. The community is vertically divided into two sub divisions called Koora and Kanni, further subdivided into 47 sub sects. Each sub sect is called Kootams, which regulates certain social events. Each kootam has its own deity, which is common to the entire group and once yearly the members of the same kootam assemble to worship the deity.

Many native tribals in the Palani Hills have partially assimilated modern culture but are marginalized on the fringes of society. Their social, economic and physical survival has become a difficult challenge for them and several public and private agencies. Their ancient culture in this area is well documented,.

Relics and artifacts of the Paliyan tribes people can be seen in the Shenbaganur Museum.

Ecoregions
 
The Palani hills are the easternmost part of the Western Ghats of India, which is one of the 25 biodiversity hotspots of the world. Some of the very rare and endangered plants and animals of India are found here. including intact relics of primary indigenous vegetation and a large number of non-native plants.

The hills may be divided into four distinct vertical zones comprising distinct Ecoregions with a wide diversity of Endemic species.

 The foothills from  consist mostly of Deccan thorn scrub forests and South Deccan Plateau dry deciduous forests. There is also some evergreen forest along streams and rivers at these altitudes.
 Between  is dominated by South Western Ghats moist deciduous forests accompanied by shrub savannah, although most has been converted to plantations.
 From  are upper montane slopes characterised by shola-grassland mosaic, composed of frost-tolerant montane grasslands on the hills interspersed with pockets of dense shola forests in the valleys. This is an undulating plateau interspersed with occasional peaks.
The grassland component is now largely replaced by forest plantations of wattle, pine and some eucalyptus .

Flora and fauna
 

Mammals: Wild are common in areas away from human habitation and cultivation. Threatened species in the park area include: Bengal tiger, Indian elephant, Indian leopard, gaur (wild ox), Nilgiri tahr and grizzled giant squirrel.

Endangered Bengal tiger populations in the adjacent Project Tiger reserves of Anamalai Tiger Reserve and the Kalakkad Mundanthurai Tiger Reserve in the Agasthyamalai hills could expand back into this area when it is better protected. In February 2010, tigers were sighted in Kodaikanal forests during a six-day carnivore signs survey. A tigress and her cub were spotted playing in the wild. Forest Department officials are studying survey data to estimate the local tiger population based on indirect evidence like pug marks, scats and scratches.

Amphibians and reptiles: 
Several little-known and endemic species of amphibians like Raorchestes dubois, Ghatixalus asterops, Micrixalus nigraventris, Indirana leptodactyla, Nyctibatrachus deccanensis and reptiles like Salea anamallayana, Hemidactylus anamallensis, Kaestlea palnica, Kaestlea travancorica, Ristella rurkii, Platyplectrurus madurensis, Teretrurus rhodogaster, Uropeltis pulneyensis, Uropeltis broughami, Uropeltis woodmasoni, Ahaetulla dispar, Boiga dightoni and Trimeresurus macrolepis occur in this sanctuary. Other more widespread species of herpetofauna also occur lower down.

Plants: 
 
These sholas are often hotspots of endemic plant life. Notable among these is Pambar Shola. It contains several rare and endemic plant species including: Sonerila pulneyensis: a delicate Melastomataceae succulent herb endemic to Pambar Shola, Hoya wightii ssp. pulneyensis: a succulent vine with waxy flowers endemic to Pambar Shola', Plectranthus bourneate: a succulent herb endemic to Pambar Shola, Trichoglottis tenera: an epiphytic orchid. Pambar Shola is its major habitat, Phyllanthus chandrabosei: a shrub endemic to Pambar Shola, Huperzia sp.: a fern ally endemic to Pambar Shola, Selaginella sp.: a delicate creeping fern endemic to Pambar Shola, Psydraxficiformis: a tree, until recently thought extinct, Utleria salicifolia: only one clump known on the Palni hills, Elaeocarpus blascoi: a tree believed extinct until this year, Cyathea crinita: tree fern, highly endangered (Botanical Survey of India), Aeschynanthus perrottetii: known only from one other shola in the Palni hills, Eulophia sp.: a new species for the Palni hills first collected in April 2000,Actinodapohne bourneae: Laurel tree believed extinct (Botanical Survey of India). Two trees found in Pambar Shola, Ceropegia thwaitesii: vine, vulnerable, endemic to Pambar shola, Pimpinella pulneyensis: scarce, Exacum anamallayannum: gentian, only one other known location in Palni hills.

The comprehensive source on Palani Hills flora is currently in print:  "The Flora of the Palni Hills, South India" by K.M. Matthew (1999), Tiruchirapalli, 3 vols., xcvi, 1880 p., figs., maps, $193 (set). . Contents:

Volume I : Polypetalae: Dedication. Preface. Novelties in this Flora. Precursory or related publications. References. Introduction. I. The Palni hills: 1. Location and physical features. 2. Kodaikanal: taluk and town. 3. Rivers. 4. Roads. 5. Table 2: Gazetteer of localities. 6. Climatic conditions at Kodaikanal. 7. Geology and soils. 8. History. 9. The vegetation: A. Native; B. Alien. 10. References. II. Plant explorations on the Palnis: 1. Past explorations: 1. The Bournes. 2. The Fysons. 3. The Shembaganur team. 4. Natural History Centre at Shembaganur (SHC). 5. Recent explorations. 6. References. 2. Present exploration: 1. Background and scope. 2. Field trip report. 3. Phytogeographical findings. 4. Ethnobotany. 5. Nature conservation. 3. The present Flora: Format and conventions. Acknowledgments. Family sequence. Key to families. Dicotyledones: I. Polypetalae: 1. Ranunculaceae. 2. Alangiaceae.
Volume II : Gamopetalae: 1. Caprifoliaceae. 2. Labiatae. III. Monochlamvdeae: 1. Plantaginaceae. 2. Salicaceae.
Volume III : Monocotyledones: 1. Orchidaceae. 2. Gramineae. II. Gymnospermae: 1. Gnetaceae. 2. Cycadaceae.

Kurinji flowers (Strobilanthes kunthiana) which blossom in spectacular fields of violet only once in 12 years are threatened.

Threat aversion

There is decreasing biodiversity, deforestation, grasslands destruction, monoculture tree plantations, and invasive exotic plant species in the park.
There is sewage pollution, solid waste pollution and mercury contamination, and mercury pollution.
 There is also sound pollution, visual pollution, uncontrolled tourism, overdevelopment and lake eutrophication in and near Kodaikanal town. The Government of Tamil Nadu and several local NGO conservation groups are actively working to reduce some of these threats:
The Government of Tamil Nadu completed establishment of a litter free zone and awareness campaign in Kodaikanal in 2000 at a cost of Rs 1. lakh. 
 The Tamil Nadu Water Supply and Drainage Board, the Public Works Department and the local bodies are executing Bioremediation of Kodaikanal Lake under the National Lake Conservation Programme, with an expenditure of Rs.33.90 lakhs incurred till 2007.
The Tamil Nadu Forest Dept. is implementing forest maintenance and restoration works over a period of 5 years from 2006 to 2007. Government of Tamil Nadu has sanctioned a sum of Rs.30.00 crores for the following components:
Conservation and eco-restoration of degraded forests in Nilgiris and Palani Hills. During 2007–2008, it is proposed to take up degraded sholas over an extent of 3 square kilometres and to carry out other maintenance and improvement works at a cost of Rs. 590.75 lakhs.
Improvement of roads in the forest areas of Tamil Nadu.
Bio-diversity conservation.
Maintenance and special repairs to Forest Department buildings.
Raising shola seedlings for afforestation.

A sum of Rs.1327.50 lakhs has been released for this purpose during 2006–2007. 
The Palani Hills Conservation Council (PHCC) was formed by concerned residents in 1985 One of its first goals was to support and push for the creation of a national park or a wildlife sanctuary in the Palni Hills. Zafar Futehally and M.S. Viraraghavan were its leaders. The PHCC made a clear connection between natural forests and water security and coined the phrase: "The health of the hills is the wealth of the plains." The PHCC generated a National Park proposal used by the Tamil Nadu Forest Department. One of the council's major contributions has been the creation of nurseries for indigenous trees. Today, thanks to its efforts, young shola trees thrive at Kodai institutions and in private gardens.  The organisation sought to restrict unsustainable building development in the 1990s. The PHCC has been active in the case against mercury contamination of the once beautiful Pambar Shola.,
The Vattakanal Conservation Trust promotes the conservation of Palni Hills' native plants and habitats by raising plant nurseries, establishing conservation gardens, working with the Forest Department to restore habitats and acquiring properties to ensure survival of specific species and ecosystems
Kodaikanal International School supports and leads environmental initiatives in the surrounding area. It offers an International Baccalaureate Program course on Environmental Systems.
The Save Kurinji Campaign Council organises campaigns and programmes for conservation of the Kurinji plant and its habit.
The Tamil Nadu Green Movement works on Nature Education, Conservation awareness, Judicial intervention, media awareness and works with other NGOs in the Western Ghats.
Elephant Valley at Vilpatti, 8 km NW of Kodaikanal, is a  private nature reserve and organic farm welcoming eco-tourists. They promote the conservation of traditional varieties of fruits, vegetables and cereals, including vegetables of all colours, shapes and sizes and orchards of lime, orange, avocados, guavas and amla intercropped with coffee, pepper, vanilla, cinnamon, nutmeg, mangoes, jack fruit, pomegranate, guavas and bananas.

Visitor information 
The Kodaikanal Division Forest Office offers a book called "Kodaikanal Beauty in Wilderness" (Rs 20), which has a list and map of local treks in the Kodaikanal area. Several trekking destinations are accessible from the Kodaikanal–Munnar Road. Permission from the Forest Department is necessary to visit areas deep inside the forests and for trekking in forests.  Forest rest houses are available with advance reservation at Kodaikkanal, Poombarai, Kukkal, Kavunji, Berijam and Devadanapatty.
Contact: District Forest officer, Kodaikkanal Forest Division, Kodaikanal, Dindigal District, Tamil Nadu, India. (open 10 am to 6 pm) Phone : 91-4542-240287

External sources
20 years on, Kodaikanal wildlife sanctuary yet to take shape, The Hindu, 1 September 2012, P. OPPILI and B. ARAVIND KUMAR

Notes

Wildlife sanctuaries in Tamil Nadu
Dindigul district
Proposed protected areas